The Secretariat of the Lao People's Revolutionary Party, known as the Executive Committee from 2006 to 2011, is an organ of the Central Committee of the Lao People's Revolutionary Party.

History
The Secretariat of the Central Committee was established at the 2nd LPRP National Congress, held on 3–6 February 1972. It was to be led by the General Secretary of the Central Committee and responsible for handling day-to-day affairs. The four members elected to the 2nd Secretariat concurrently served as members of the 2nd Politburo.

The party leadership structure was reformed at the 5th LPRP National Congress, held on 27–29 March 1991, and the office of General Secretary of the Central Committee was with the post of Chairman of the Central Committee and the Secretariat was abolished.

At the 8th National Congress the Secretariat was reestablished in the form of the Executive Committee.

The 1st Plenary Session of the 11th Central Committee elected two women to the 11th Secretariat for the first time in that body's history.

Terms

See also
Lao People's Revolutionary Party
Central Committee of the Lao People's Revolutionary Party
Politburo of the Lao People's Revolutionary Party

References

Bibliography 
Books:
 

Secretariat of the Lao People's Revolutionary Party
Secretariats of communist parties
1972 establishments in Laos
1991 disestablishments in Laos
2006 establishments in Laos